Kardala is a Palestinian hamlet located in the Tubas Governorate, 13 kilometers northeast of Tubas adjacent to Bardala in the west and Ein al-Beida in the east. It had a population of 160 inhabitants in 2006. It is located on the eastern foothills of the northern Jordan Valley on a fertile plain of land. It is situated at a low elevation of -99 meters below sea level.

Kardala was established in the 1930s. The founders were members of the Daraghmah clan from Tubas who worked as farmers and raised livestock. After the 1948-Arab Israeli War, the A’Hashah family from the Gaza area migrated here as Palestinian refugees. Despite being under the population limit, Kardala is governed by a village council,  although instead of consisting of seven members, the council is made up of three members.

Nearly all working residents, spend their livelihoods in agriculture. Of the hamlet's 800 dunams, 250 are arable lands. The built-up area of the village is 30 dunams. Working residents comprise 66% of the population, of which women represent 31%. The average income is 1,000 NIS. There are no schools or health centers in the village, however, a health clinic is being built. About 85% the residents are literate and attend schools in Bardala. Most university students go to the al-Quds Open University campus in Tubas.

References

External links
Welcome To Kh. Kardala,
Kardala (Fact Sheet), The Applied Research Institute - Jerusalem. February, 2006

Villages in the West Bank
Municipalities of the State of Palestine